Granahan is a surname. Notable people with the surname include:

Gerry Granahan (1932–2022), American singer, songwriter, and record producer
Kathryn E. Granahan (1894–1979), Democratic member of the U.S. House of Representatives from Pennsylvania
William T. Granahan (1895–1956), Democratic politician from the U.S. state of Pennsylvania